Rich Township High School Fine Arts Campus, formerly known as, Rich South High School (RSHS) is a public four-year high school located in Richton Park, Illinois, a southern suburb of Chicago, in the United States. Rich Township's campus serves the cities of Matteson, Park Forest, Richton Park, Olympia Fields and University Park. It is a part of Rich Township District 227.

Renovations
A new auditorium was completed for the 2006-2007 school year.

A new cafeteria was completed for the 2008-2009 school year.  This renovation included converting the old cafeteria into a new media center, and converting the old media center into additional classroom space.

Notable alumni
 Greg Lewis, NFL player
Dreezy, Rapper
Mikey Rocks, Rapper
Mark Spitznagel, Hedge Fund Manager

References

External links

Official website
Rich Township High School District 227

Public high schools in Cook County, Illinois